In commutative algebra, the constructible topology on the spectrum  of a commutative ring  is a topology where each closed set is the image of  in  for some algebra B over A. An important feature of this construction is that the map  is a closed map with respect to the constructible topology.

With respect to this topology,  is a compact, Hausdorff, and totally disconnected topological space (i.e., a Stone space). In general, the constructible topology is a finer topology than the Zariski topology, and the two topologies coincide if and only if  is a von Neumann regular ring, where  is the nilradical of A.

Despite the terminology being similar, the constructible topology is not the same as the set of all constructible sets.

See also
Constructible set (topology)

References 

Commutative algebra
Topology